Peter Smagorinsky is an educator, researcher, and theorist currently who worked at the University of Georgia. He holds the title of Distinguished Research Professor of English Education. Following high school, Smagorinsky received his Bachelor of Arts in English Literature from Kenyon College in Gambier, Ohio in 1974. He went on to receive a Master of Arts in Teaching in English Education from the University of Chicago in 1977. During his career as a high school English teacher, Smagorinsky continued his education at the University of Chicago, receiving his Ph.D. in English Education in 1989, advised by George Hillocks. In 2000 Smagorinsky was promoted to full professor, and in 2011, Smagorinsky received the title of Distinguished Research Professor from The University of Georgia. He retired in 2020.

He is one of the five children of Margaret Smagorinsky, the Weather Bureau's first female statistician and meteorologist Joseph Smagorinsky.

References 

University of Chicago alumni
Kenyon College alumni
University of Georgia faculty
Year of birth missing (living people)
Living people